Anvita Dutt Guptan (born 20 February 1972) is an Indian dialogue writer, screenplay writer, story writer, lyricist and director of Bollywood films.

Early life and background
Her father worked with the Indian Air Force (IAF), thus she grew up in several military cantonments across India, including Hindon, Guwahati, Jodhpur and Saharanpur.

Career
She worked in advertising for 14 years, before she was introduced to Aditya Chopra by Rekha Nigam, who is dialogue writer of Parineeta and Laaga Chunari Mein Daag, thus starting her film career as a lyricist and screenwriter with Yash Raj Films. She then worked with Dharma Productions as a lyricist and dialogue writer. Followed by Nadiadwala Grandson Films as a dialogue writer on one project. And as a dialogue writer and lyricist on the second project.

She has also worked with Nikhil Advani as a dialogue writer and lyricist. She then went back to working again with YRF but under their banner of Y films for two films. After a hiatus she worked with Phantom films. She is currently directing films for Clean Slate Filmz. 
Her first film Bulbbul has been released as a Netflix Original on 24 June 2020 and met with positive views from both the audience and critics regarding its stand on feminism, visual effects, background music and performance of lead actress Tripti Dimri but was criticised for its short length and predictable plot. Bulbbul is set in a backdrop of 1880s Bengal presidency and revolves around a child-bride plus her journey from innocence to strength.

Her second directorial venture, Qala, starring Tripti Dimri. It is a period drama set in the 1930s and ’40s was released on 1 December 2022. written and directed by her, this movie shows the ugly side of ambition and an abusive childhood.

Filmography
As Director

Lyricist

Awards and nominations

References

External links
 
 
 
 
 

Living people
Hindi-language lyricists
1972 births
Indian women screenwriters
Indian lyricists
Writers from Delhi
Yash Raj Films people
21st-century Indian women writers
21st-century Indian writers
21st-century Indian dramatists and playwrights
21st-century Indian short story writers
Women writers from Delhi
Hindi screenwriters
Screenwriters from Delhi
21st-century Indian screenwriters
Indian women songwriters